Costa Rica competed at the 1988 Winter Olympics in Calgary, Canada.

Competitors
The following is the list of number of competitors in the Games.

Alpine skiing

Men

Cross-country skiing

Men

C = Classical style, F = Freestyle

References

Official Olympic Reports
 Olympic Winter Games 1988, full results by sports-reference.com

Nations at the 1988 Winter Olympics
1988 Winter Olympics